Lawrence Randolph Hafstad (June 18, 1904 – October 12, 1993) was an American electrical engineer and physicist notable for his pioneering work on nuclear reactors. In 1939, he created the first nuclear fission reaction in the United States.

Biography
Hafstad was born in Minneapolis, Minnesota. He was the son of two Norwegian immigrants. He attended the University of Minnesota, graduating in electrical engineering in 1926.  He had begun working with the Carnegie Institution for Science from 1928. In 1931, he earned the American Association for the Advancement of Science Prize for his research with Merle A. Tuve and Odd Dahl.

He was awarded his Ph.D. in Physics at Johns Hopkins University in 1933. Between 1935 and 1947, he was a frequent participant at the Washington Conferences on Theoretical Physics sponsored by George Washington University and Carnegie Institute of Washington.
Between 1946 and 1954, he was a Professor of Physics at Johns Hopkins University. From 1947-1949, he was director of the Johns Hopkins University Applied Physics Laboratory.  During that same period, he was Executive Secretary of the Research and Development Board at the Department of Defense. From 1949 to 1955, he served as Director of Reactor Development with the United States Atomic Energy Commission. In 1955, he became a vice president at the General Motors Corporation and was chief of its research laboratories. In 1968, Hafstad was elected to the National Academy of Engineering.

Hafstad died on October 12, 1993, at his home in the Oldwick section of Tewksbury Township, New Jersey.

Honors and awards
Medal of Merit of the United States Navy (1946)
King's Medal in Defense of Freedom of the British Government   (1946)

References

External links
Merle Tuve, Lawrence Hafstad, and Odd Dahl with a cloud chamber for high voltage work in 1931

Related Reading
Castell, Lutz; Otfried Ischebeck (2013) Time, Quantum and Information (Springer Science & Business Media) 
Dahl, Per F. (2002) From Nuclear Transmutation to Nuclear Fission, 1932-1939 (CRC Press) 
Fernandez, Bernard; Georges Ripka (2012) Unravelling the Mystery of the Atomic Nucleus (Springer Science & Business Media) 
Mehra, Jagdish (2004) The Conceptual Completion and Extensions of Quantum Mechanics 1932-1941 (Springer Science & Business Media) 

1904 births
1993 deaths
20th-century American engineers
20th-century American physicists
People from Tewksbury Township, New Jersey
Scientists from Minneapolis
University of Minnesota College of Science and Engineering alumni
Johns Hopkins University alumni
Members of the United States National Academy of Engineering
American people of Norwegian descent
Fellows of the American Physical Society
South High School (Minnesota) alumni